Rajya Sabha elections were held in 2002, to elect members of the Rajya Sabha, Indian Parliament's upper chamber. The elections were held to elect respectively 56 members from 17 states and four seats from Karnataka, four members from Jammu and Kashmir, and 11 members from two states for the Council of States, the Rajya Sabha.

Elections
Elections were held in 2002 to elect members from various states.
The list is incomplete.

Members elected
The following members are elected in the elections held in 2002. They are members for the term 2002–2008 and retire in year 2008, except in case of the resignation or death before the term.

State - Member - Party

Bye-elections
The following bye elections were held in the year 2002.

State - Member - Party

 Bye-elections were held on 30/05/2002 for vacancy from Tripura and Punjab due to election to Lok Sabha of seating member Khagan Das on 25.02.2002 with term ending on 02.04.2004 and due to resignation of seating member Balwinder Singh Bhunder on 07.03.2002 with term ending on 09.04.2004

 Bye-elections were held on 30/05/2002 for vacancy from Uttar Pradesh and Jharkhand due to election to Lok Sabha of seating member Mohd. Azam Khan on 09.03.2002 with term ending on 25.11.2002 and due to resignation of seating member Dayanand Sahay on 19.03.2002 with term ending on 07.07.2004

 Bye-elections were held on 01/07/2002 for vacancy from Jharkhand due to election to JH Assembly of seating member Shibu Soren on 2 June 2002 with term ending on 2 April 2008.

 Bye-elections were held on 01/07/2002 for vacancy from Maharashtra due to death of seating member Mukeshbhai R Patel on 15 June 2002 with term ending on 2 April 2008. P C Alexander became member as IND candidate on bye 29/07/2002.

 Bye-elections were held on 18/11/2002 for vacancy from Uttar Pradesh due to resignation of seating member T N Chaturvedi on 20.8.2002 with term ending on --.

References

2002 elections in India
2002